Pakistani passports are passports issued by the Government of Pakistan to Pakistani citizens and nationals for the purpose of international travel. They are issued by the Directorate General of Immigration & Passports (DGIP) of the Ministry of Interior from regional passport offices and Pakistani embassies. Since January 2014, Pakistani passports have validity for 5 and 10 years. Under national law, Pakistani passports are explicitly invalid for travel to Israel. However, Pakistanis may travel to Israel after receiving confirmation from the Israeli Foreign Ministry.

Pakistani passports are machine-readable and biometric. Until 2004, Pakistani passports had the bearers' particulars written by hand, with the passport picture glued to the cover page; since then, passports have identity information printed on both the front and back cover ends, and both of these pages are laminated to prevent unlawful modification. In 2004, Pakistan began issuing biometric passports which, however, were not compliant with the United Nations' ICAO standards because they did not carry the “chip inside” symbol. Pakistani passports are printed at the DGIP headquarters in the capital city of Islamabad.

On March 30, 2022, former Prime Minister Imran Khan launched the e-passport service, which have Twenty-nine latest new security features added. Initially, the e-passport facility was available only for diplomatic and government officials. Issuance for ordinary e-passports was approved on December 30, 2022 and their issuance was started on January 1, 2023. However, in the first phase of production, these passports will only be provided to the citizens of Islamabad and citizens can only apply for the e-passport at Directorate General of Immigration & Passports Headquarters, which is located in Islamabad. As of January 22, 2023 these passports are still only being issued to citizens of Islamabad through the DGI&P HQ.

Types
The Passport Act, 1974 and Passport and Visa Manual (1974) regulate the issuance of Pakistani passports. The Government of Pakistan issues three types of passports to its nationals:

 Diplomatic passports — issued by the Ministry of Foreign Affairs to diplomats and other similarly entitled categories. The outer cover colour of this passport type is red.
 Official passports — issued to senators, members of the National Assembly, provincial ministers, judges of the Supreme Court of Pakistan and high courts, officers serving with the governments when abroad on official assignments, and other government officials. The outer cover colour of this passport type is blue.
 Ordinary passports — issued to regular Pakistani citizens, the outer cover colour of this passport type is green.

E-Passport

Pakistan started issuing E Passport in 2023. The e-Passport is a highly secure travel document. It has an electronic chip embedded in one of the passport pages, which will be used to store biometric information about the holder. The chip contains data that will verify the passport holder’s identity and will include the biometrics of the passport holder, the personal data found on the data page of the passport, a unique identification number and a digital signature. An e-passport has a contactless (NFC) chip on it which means that those passports can be read electronically. The newly launched e-Passports in Pakistan are in compliance with the United Nations’ ICAO standards.

Discontinued types 

Pakistan formerly issued a special Hajj passport to Pakistani nationals making an Islamic pilgrimage known as Hajj to Mecca, Saudi Arabia. These are no longer issued, and ordinary Pakistani passports may now be used for this purpose. Prior to independence, a British Indian Passport was used.

Security features

The key security features of the Pakistani passport are:
 PKI – public key infrastructure
 Biometrics, namely facial and fingerprint
 IPI – invisible personal ID
 2D barcode
 Machine-readable zone (MRZ)
 Security substrate and laminate
 Ultraviolet-feature microprinting
 Holograms
 Watermark paper
 Security ink
 3-colour intaglio printing
 Guilloché patterns

Physical appearance

Ordinary Pakistani passports have a deep green cover with golden-coloured content. The Emblem of Pakistan is emblazoned in the center of the front cover. The words 'Islamic Republic of Pakistan' (English) are inscribed above the emblem and '', '' and 'Passport' (English) are inscribed below the emblem. The standard passport contains 36 pages, but frequent travellers can apply for a passport containing 72 or 100 pages.

Passport holder identity

 The opening cover end contains the following information:
 Photo of passport holder
 Type 'P'- stands for "Personal", 'D'- stands for "Diplomat", — S'- stands for "Service"
 Country Code
 Passport number 
 Surname
 Given name
 Nationality
 Date of birth 
 Citizenship number 
 Gender
 Place of birth
 Father name
 Date of issue 
 Date of expiry
Issuing authority
 Tracking number
 Booklet number
 First page of regular booklet contains the note from President of Pakistan (mentioned later).
 Second page mentions ANNOTATION on the top and contains the following
 Religion
 Previous passport number (if any)
 Signature of the passport holder
 Third page declares that the passport is valid to travel to all countries of the world except Israel.
Back cover

The information on the inside back cover of a Pakistani passport states in Urdu only (English translation below):

ضوابط ۱- یہ پاسپورٹ حکومت پاکستان کی ملکیت ہے - بیرونی ممالک میں رائج امیگریشن ضوابط کی پابندی ہر حامل پاسپورٹ پر لازم ہوگی جن ممالک میں داخلے کے لئے ویزا حاصل کرنا ضروری ہو وہاں جانے سے پہلے ویزا حاصل کرنا چاہیے ۔ ۳- منسوخ شده یا زائدالمیعاد پاسپورٹ دوسال تک لے پاسپورٹ کے ساتھ رکھنا چاہئے کیونکہ زرمبادلہ کے لئے درخواست دیتے وقت شخص متعلقہ کو اس کی ضرورت پڑے گی ۔ گر پاسپورٹ کم یا ضائع ہو جاۓ تو پولیس اور پاکستان کے پاسپورٹ جاری کرنے والے قریب ترین دفترمیں فورا اطلاع کرنی چاہئے ۔ بیرونی ممالک میں ایسی اطلاع قریب ترین پاکستانی سفارت خانہ یا قونصل خانہ کو دی جائے ۔ ۵ - پاسپورٹ میں تبدیلی یا اضافہ وغیرہ صرف مجاز عہد یدار کرسکتا ہے ۔ قانون کی رو سے ایسے اشخاص موجب سزا قرار دیئے جا سکتے ہیں جو پاسپورٹ میں کسی قسم کی تبدیلی یا ردو بدل کر میں نیز ایسے لوگ بھی سزا کے مستحق ہیں جن کے قبضے میں ناجائز طور پر ایسا پاسپورٹ ہو جو انھیں قانونی طورسے نہ دیا گیا ہو ۔ ملک سے بذریعہ ڈاک یا کسی اور طریقے سے پاسپورٹ کسی دوسرے ملک بھیجنا قانونا جرم ہے ۔ رجسٹریشن بیرونی ممالک میں تین ماہ سے زیادہ قیام کرنے والے پاکستانی شہریوں پر لازم ہے کہ وہ قواعد شہرت پاکستان ۱۹۵۲ ء کے تحت ہر سال اپنا نام قریب ترین پاکستانی سفارت خانہ یا قونصل خانہ میں رجسٹر کرا لیا کریں پتہ کی تبدیلی اور ملک سے روانگی کی اطلاع سفارت خانہ یا قونصل خانہ کو دینی ضروری ہے ۔ نیز یہ کہ اگر بیرون ملک پاکستانی شہری کے کوئی بچہ پیدا ہو تو اس کا نام بھی قریب ترین پاکستانی سفارت خانہ یا قونصل خانہ میں مندرجہ بالا قواعد کے تحت رجسٹر کرائیں تاکہ بوقت ضرورت انھیں سفارت خانہ کی امداد اور مشورہ حاصل ہوسکے ۔

Regulations:
 This passport is owned by the Government of Pakistan.
 Compliance with the existing immigration regulations in foreign countries will be mandatory on every passport holder. One must obtain a visa before entering the countries for which it is necessary to obtain a visa.
 Revoked or overdue passport should be kept with the passport for up to two years as the person concerned will need it while applying for foreign exchange.
 If the passport is lost or wasted, the police and the nearest Pakistani passport issuing office should be notified immediately. Such information should be given to the nearest Pakistani embassy or consulate in foreign countries.
 Only authorized officer can change or add to the passport. According to the law, persons can be punished according to the change or alteration of their passport, as well as those who have a passport in their possession which is not given to them legally.
 It is a criminal offence to send a passport from one country to another by mail or otherwise.

Registration:
Pakistani citizens residing in foreign countries for more than three months are 
required to register their name at the nearest Pakistani embassy or consulate every 
year under the Pakistan Rules of Reputation 1952. Change of address and 
departure from the country information must be given to the embassy or 
consulate. Also, if any child of a Pakistani citizen is born abroad, his name should 
be registered in the nearest Pakistani embassy or consulate under the above rules so 
that he can get the help and advice of the embassy in case of need.

Passport in 1948

301
Shares
The Henley Passport Index (HPI) — an annual global ranking of countries according to the travel freedom of their citizens – placed the Pakistani passport at #102 in its 2019 list of most and least powerful passports of the world list.

HPI has been compiling and issuing this list since 2006 which ranks and lists passports from over a hundred countries according to the number of destinations the citizens of these countries can visit without obtaining a visa.

Pakistan's passport has continuously found itself lingering in the bottom half of the list.
Even though global passport rankings were introduced in 2006, it is believed that if the strength of the country's passport before 2006 was to be explored by using the HPI ranking and scoring model, the Pakistani passport – from 1961 till 1974 – would have been one of the top 30 passports of the world.

Passport ranking by period

Pakistani Passport HPI Rankings 2006 to 2022.
2006: 79
2007: 83
2008: 87
2009: 89
2010: 90
2011: 99
2012: 100
2013: 91
2014: 92
2015: 103
2016: 103
2017: 102
2018: 103
2019: 103
2020: 102
2021: 102
2022: 110

Passport note

The passports contain a note from the President of Pakistan addressing the authorities of all states, identifying the bearer as a citizen of the Islamic Republic of Pakistan and requesting and requiring that the bearer be allowed to pass freely without any hindrance and be assisted and protected in any need. The note inside of Pakistani passports states:

Visa requirements

, Henley Passport Index ranks the Pakistani passport at 109th place, with visa-free or visa on arrival access to 32 nations and territories to Pakistani citizens. , The Passport Index ranks the Pakistani passport 86th, with visa-free or visa on arrival access to 43 nations (based on visa-free or visa on arrival access to nations or territories).  Pakistan was ranked 94th in passport strength, which is shared with Somalia. Below Pakistan were Syria (ranked 96) and Afghanistan (ranked 77), remains one of the worst passport in the world.

See also

 Visa requirements for Pakistani citizens
 Visa policy of Pakistan

References

External links

 
 

Passports by country
Foreign relations of Pakistan
Pakistan and the Commonwealth of Nations
Pakistani nationality law